Kolone Alefosio (born 29 September 1999) is a Samoan athlete. He has represented Samoa at the Pacific Games and Commonwealth Games.

Alefosio is from Vaoala in Apia. He won a bronze medal in the 110m hurdles at the 2017 Pacific Mini Games in Port Vila. He competed in the 2018 Commonwealth Games on the Gold Coast in Australia, achieving a personal best in the 110m hurdles. He later competed in the 2019 Pacific Games in Apia, winning silver in the 4 × 100 metres relay and bronze in the 110 metres hurdles. At the 2022 Pacific Mini Games in Saipan, Northern Mariana Islands he won gold in the 110 metres hurdles, silver in the 4 × 100 metres relay, and bronze in the 4 × 400 metres relay.

On 14 July 2022 he was selected as part of Samoa's team for the 2022 Commonwealth Games in Birmingham.

References

Living people
1999 births
Sportspeople from Apia
Samoan male hurdlers
Samoan male sprinters
Commonwealth Games competitors for Samoa
Athletes (track and field) at the 2018 Commonwealth Games